A statue of Domingo Faustino Sarmiento by Ivette Compagnion is installed along Boston's Commonwealth Avenue Mall, in the U.S. state of Massachusetts.

Description and history
The bronze sculpture measures approximately 10 ft. x 4 ft. 1 in. x 3 ft. 3 in., and rests on a cement base that measures approximately  ft. 2 in. x 4 ft. 7 in. x 4 ft. 7 in. It was dedicated in May 1973. The work was surveyed by the Smithsonian Institution's "Save Outdoor Sculpture!" program in 1993.

References

External links

 

Bronze sculptures in Massachusetts
Monuments and memorials in Boston
Outdoor sculptures in Boston
Sculptures of men in Massachusetts
Statues in Boston